Jared Williams (March 4, 1766January 2, 1831) was a U.S. Representative from Virginia.

Born in Montgomery County in the Province of Maryland, Williams pursued classical studies.  He engaged in agricultural pursuits.  He served as member of the Virginia House of Delegates from 1812 to 1817.

Williams was elected to the Sixteenth, Seventeenth, and Eighteenth Congresses (March 4, 1819 – March 3, 1825).  He died near Newton, Virginia, January 2, 1831.

Electoral history

1819; Williams was elected to the U.S. House of Representatives with 68.32% of the vote, defeating fellow Democratic-Republican John Smith.
1821; Williams was re-elected with 63.33% of the vote, defeating fellow Democratic-Republican William Steinbergen.

Sources

1766 births
1831 deaths
Members of the Virginia House of Delegates
People from Montgomery County, Maryland
Democratic-Republican Party members of the United States House of Representatives from Virginia
19th-century American politicians